Brickopolis is a three-story entertainment venue in Bricktown, Oklahoma City, in the U.S. state of Oklahoma. Features include an arcade, laser tag, and an 18-hole miniature golf course. Brickopolis was opened by owner Chris Johnson in 2015.

References

External links

 
 

2015 establishments in Oklahoma
Bricktown, Oklahoma City
Tourist attractions in Oklahoma City